Undargaon is a village in the Karmala taluka of Solapur district in Maharashtra state, India.

Demographics
Covering  and comprising 164 households at the time of the 2011 census of India, Undargaon had a population of 700. There were 380 males and 320 females, with 90 people being aged six or younger.

References

Villages in Karmala taluka